Dans la maison d'Edith is an essay written by French Nobel laureate J. M. G. Le Clézio. It was written in French and has not been translated into English, however the title translates as In Edith's House.

Preface
The preface to this book was written by Le Clézio.

Drawings and photographs
Drawings and photographs were provided for the World literature today article by J. M. G. Le Clézio and his wife Jemia Le Clézio.

Publication history
1997, USA, World literature today. University of Oklahoma 

British Library Serials BL Shelfmark:9356.558600;Excerpt

References

1997 essays
Essays by J. M. G. Le Clézio
Works by J. M. G. Le Clézio